The Changan CS85 Coupe is a fastback mid-size SUV produced by Changan Automobile.

Overview

The Changan CS85 Coupe was revealed during the 2019 Guangzhou Auto Show and was launched in China right after in March 2019.

The CS85 mid-size CUV sits right below the CS95 mid-size CUV, the largest passenger car under the Changan product range, with the price range of the Changan CS85 ranging from 136,900 yuan to 169,900 yuan.

Specifications
A 1.5-litre turbo engine was added later. There is two options for the gearbox a 7-speed DCT or 8-speed automatic.

References

External links

 

CS85
Mid-size sport utility vehicles
Crossover sport utility vehicles
Cars of China
Cars introduced in 2019